The We Are Born Tour was the fourth concert tour by the Australian recording artist Sia in support of her fifth studio album, We Are Born (2010). It is a continuation of her 2010 tour, after several dates were cancelled.

Opening acts
Oh Land
Ximena Sariñana

Setlist
The following setlist was obtained from the show held 21 July 2011, at First Avenue in Minneapolis, Minnesota. It does not represent all concerts for the duration of the tour. 
"The Fight"
"Buttons"
"Oh Father"
"Hostage"
"Big Girl Little Girl"
"Cloud"
"I Go to Sleep"
"I'm Not Important to You"
"Be Good to Me"
"Taken for Granted
"Hurting Me Now"
"Soon We'll Be Found"
"My Love"
"Never Gonna Leave Me"
"I'm In Here"
Encore
"Clap Your Hands"
"Breathe Me"

Tour dates

Festivals and other miscellaneous performances
This concert was a part of the "Osheaga Music and Arts Festival
This concert was a part of the "Outside Lands Music and Arts Festival"

Box office score data

References 

2011 concert tours
Sia (musician)